Mûkûûrî is an administrative Location and township in Runyenjes Division, in Embu County, Kenya, with a population of about 15,000 people. It lies on the green, rolling hills of the Mount Kenya slopes. It is home to four public primary schools, including Kubu Kubu Memorial Boarding School and Muragari School, which is among the oldest schools in Embu and Kîrînyaga districts.

Mukuuri is also home to the historic Kîrîmîri Forest Hill. The 800-acre forest was popular during Kenya's freedom war the Mau Mau. The Embu freedom fighter Kubu Kubu made the forest his main hideout. He was killed by the colonialists early 1950s. The colonial rulers burnt his body to ashes on the present location of Kubu Kubu Memorial School. General China, in his book The Mau Mau General, says women and children were forced to clap and sing as the body turned into ashes. This angered the residents and more Mau Mau fighters like Kaviu îtina were recruited.

It is also home to the historic Gogo Salt Lick, well-known as a place of Mûnyû (salt) for hundreds of years in Embu land. Gogo Salt Lick is located on five-acre grassy meadows, one kilometre from Mukuuri township, at the base of a ridge called Mürurîrî.  According to the Mbeere Historical Texts by Prof Mwaniki Kabeca (2005), Gogo is the place where Mwenendega, the founder of Embu tribe, met his wife Nthara.

The time zone in Mukuuri is Africa/Nairobi
Sunrise at 06:39 and Sunset at 18:46. 
Latitude. -0.4000°, Longitude. 37.5500° 
For Kirimiri - Latitude. -0.4167°, Longitude. 37.5500°

Notable former residents
The area has produced a number of leaders at national and international levels. They include current Embu Governor Martin Nyaga Wambora,  KASNEB founder and former MP Stanley Nyaga Kithung'a and Lee Njiru, the long-serving head of the Presidential Press Service and Private Secretary of Kenya's Second President Daniel Arap Moi . Others are academics like Kenyan geneticist Prof Njiruh Nthakanio, veteran Embu Knut secretary general Mohammed Mwaniki Gakinya, and the long-serving Kagaari North councillor and Embu County Council chairman, the late Njeru Ngari. There is also the late freedom fighter General Kubu Kubu and religious leaders like former Embu Anglican Bishop Moses Njue (1992-2006), Embu Bishop of National Independent Church of Kenya (Nica) Bishop Amos Njiru (1993*-2003*), and business leaders including Richard Nyaga wa Stanley, who served as MD of national carrier Kenya Airways (1981-1985) and later steered privatisation of  the airline again as its Managing Director in 1999–2003.
. Mzee Kariuki Kobuthi, the man who  treated President Jomo Kenyatta by cutting off his uvula in 1960s when Kenyatta was very ill, also lives in Mukuuri.

References

External links
Embu travel guide

Populated places in Central Province (Kenya)
Embu County